A mercury-manganese star (also HgMn star) is a type of chemically peculiar star with a prominent spectral line at 398.4 nm, due to absorption from ionized mercury.  These stars are of spectral type B8, B9, or A0, corresponding to surface temperatures between about 10,000 and 15,000 K, with two distinctive characteristics:
 An atmospheric excess of elements like phosphorus, manganese, gallium, strontium, yttrium, zirconium, platinum and mercury.
 A lack of a strong dipole magnetic field.

Their rotation is relatively slow, and as a consequence their atmosphere is relatively calm.  It is thought, but has not been proven, that some types of atoms sink under the force of gravity, while others are lifted towards the exterior of the star by radiation pressure, making a heterogeneous atmosphere.

List
The following table includes the brightest stars in this group.

References 

Star types

Mercury (element)
Manganese